The Duchy of Inowrocław was one of the territories created during the period of the fragmentation of Poland. It was originally part of the Duchy of Kuyavia, but was separated by Ziemomysł and Władysław I the Elbow-high, upon the death of Duke Casimir I in 1267.

The Inowrocław Voivodeship was established on the territory of duchy in 1364.

Dukes of Inowrocław 
 1267–1287 Ziemomysł of Kuyavia
 1287–1320/24 Leszek of Kuyavia, son
 1287–1314 Przemysł of Sieradz, younger brother, with Leszek
 1320/24-1327 Przemysł of Sieradz, again
 1327–1333 Władysław I the Elbow-high, brother of Ziemomysł of Kuyavia
 1333-1370 Casimir III the Great, son
 1370-1377 Casimir IV, Duke of Pomerania, adopted son
 1378-1392 Władysław Opolczyk, great-grandson of Władysław I the Elbow-high

Sources 
  Inowrocław is the pearl of Kujawy

Duchy of Inowrocław
14th-century disestablishments in Poland
Former monarchies of Europe
States and territories established in 1267
States and territories disestablished in 1364
Duchies of Poland
Fiefdoms of Poland